William Taylor (born 24 January 1947 in Manchester) is an English former first-class cricketer active 1971–77 who played for Nottinghamshire.

References

External links

1947 births
English cricketers
Cricketers from Manchester
Nottinghamshire cricketers
Living people
20th-century English people